Vito Cruz station is an elevated Manila Light Rail Transit (LRT) station situated on Line 1. The station serves Malate in Manila and is the first station from Baclaran and the last station from Roosevelt to lie within Manila city bounds. The station takes its name from the former Vito Cruz Street (now Pablo Ocampo Sr. Street), which was named after a former alcalde mayor of Pineda (present-day Pasay) .

The station is the fifth station for trains headed to Roosevelt and the sixteenth station for trains headed to Baclaran. The station is near some major landmarks, such as the Bangko Sentral ng Pilipinas complex, the University Mall shopping center, and the Rizal Memorial Sports Complex, where some of the sports in previous Southeast Asian Games were played. The Cultural Center of the Philippines Complex is near this station as well, although commute is also an option due to its distance. Located in this complex are the CCP Main Building, the Philippine International Convention Center, Folk Arts Theater, Manila Film Center, and the Harbour Square.

The station is also close to some educational institutions, such as the main campus of Arellano University School of Law, De La Salle University, De La Salle–College of Saint Benilde, and St. Scholastica's College. The southbound concourse of the station is connected to the adjacent University Mall, but is currently blocked off as the entrance has since been converted into tenant space. The station was also near Harrison Plaza, but it is currently demolished and undergoing redevelopment by SM Prime.

Vito Cruz station is notorious for its unusually high number of suicide attempts. As a result, the LRTA has imposed a "speed limit" on trains entering stations to deter the number of successful suicides.

Transportation links
Buses serving the Taft Avenue route, taxis, jeepneys, UV Express, and pedicabs stop near the station. Some destinations, such as St. Scholastica's College, are within walking distance from the station. There is also a Philippine National Railways station of the same name, although the station is far from the station, requiring a commute from the station.

References

Manila Light Rail Transit System stations
Railway stations opened in 1984
Buildings and structures in Malate, Manila